Bartol Barišić (born 1 January 2003) is a Croatian footballer who plays for Domžale, on loan from Dinamo Zagreb, as a forward.

Club career
On 24 July 2020, Barišić played his first match for Dinamo Zagreb, coming on as a substitute for Sandro Kulenović in the 85th minute in a match against Varaždin.

International career
Barišić represented Croatia at all youth selections from under-14 to under-20, amassing over 30 appearances for all teams combined.

References

External links
 
 

2003 births
Living people
Footballers from Zagreb
Association football forwards
Croatian footballers
Croatia youth international footballers
GNK Dinamo Zagreb players
GNK Dinamo Zagreb II players
NK Istra 1961 players
NK Domžale players
Croatian Football League players
First Football League (Croatia) players
Slovenian PrvaLiga players
Croatian expatriate footballers
Croatian expatriate sportspeople in Slovenia
Expatriate footballers in Slovenia